Lucretilis is a genus of grasshoppers in the subfamily Oxyinae and tribe Oxyini.  Species can be found in west Malesia.

Species
The Orthoptera Species File lists:
 Lucretilis antennata Bolívar, 1898
 Lucretilis balikpapan Storozhenko, 2020
 Lucretilis bolivari Miller, 1934
 Lucretilis dohrni Ramme, 1941
 Lucretilis jucunda Miller, 1953
 Lucretilis maculata Willemse, 1936
 Lucretilis splendens Willemse, 1938
 Lucretilis taeniata Stål, 1878 - type species
 Lucretilis uvarovi Miller, 1935

References

External Links 
 

Acrididae genera
Catantopinae 
Orthoptera of Asia